Abraham van den Hecken (Antwerp, c. 1615 - c. 1655) was a Dutch Golden Age painter of genre pieces, religious and historical scenes, portraits and still lifes.  His son Abraham II van den Hecken was also an artist.

Little is known about the life of Van den Hecken. Both his birth and death dates are uncertain. He was born in Antwerp and may have died in Amsterdam, or The Hague. His father Samuel van den Hecken was a landscape and still life painter, who in the 1620s settled in the Northern Netherlands and probably trained him. His sister Magdalena also painted, mainly still life. In 1635 he married Catharina Lunden in Amsterdam, assisted by Christoffel van Sichem. In 1652 he traveled to London.

References

1615 births
1655 deaths
Dutch Golden Age painters
Dutch male painters
Dutch genre painters
Artists from Antwerp